Choi Jieun (born 21 November 1980) is a South Korean economist and politician. She served as the Spokesperson for and Senior Policy Advisor to Lee Jae Myung, previous Presidential candidate of the Democratic party and current the Party Leader. Also, Choi is as an adjunct professor at Seoul National University and a member of the Presidential Policy Planning Committee under Moon Jae In administration. Before entering politics in 2020, Choi worked as a senior economist at the World Bank and the African Development Bank.

Education 
Choi holds three degrees: a bachelor's in economics from Sogang University, a Master of Public Administration in international development from the Harvard Kennedy School, and a doctorate in international development from University of Oxford. She is a graduate of Myungduk Foreign Language High School.

Career before politics 
Choi has demonstrated herself as an expert in international development through her work at African Development Bank and World Bank.

From 2004 Choi worked at Samsung Electronics's Telecommunications Network Division overseeing its projects in China and Viet Nam before leaving for postgraduate studies at Harvard Kennedy School in 2007.

Upon graduation, Choi joined African Development Bank via Young Professionals Programme becoming as its first South Korean staff since 1982 when South Korea officially become its non-regional members. She worked as its country economist for Egypt during 2011 Arab Spring and later promoted to senior economist at its research department.

In 2013 Choi then joined World Bank as its senior economist assisting former Soviet Union countries' transition to market economies and later Africa's standing in 4th industrial revolution. Before leaving for the general election in 2020, she worked as a senior country economist for China.

Political career 
In January 2020 Choi returned to Korea and entered politics. She was recruited by the Democratic Party for the upcoming legislative election in April.

In the 2020 general election, Choi ran for the constituency in Busan - the same constituency Roh Moo-hyun unsuccessfully ran for to overcome regionalism but later became the stepping stone for Roh's presidential campaign. She lost to the incumbent parliamentarian from the main opposition party, Kim Do-eup, by the smallest margin the democratic candidate lost in 12 years - a notable figure considering this constituency never elected a democratic parliamentarian since its creation in 1996 and she just entered politics 3 months ago.

In May 2020 Choi was appointed as the international spokesperson of the Democratic Party - the first of its kind in the history of her party and preceding parties. In August 2020 the newly elected leader of her party, Lee Nak-yon, re-appointed her to the same post while creating other spokesperson posts for other areas - youth, economy and security affairs.

In October 2020 Choi joined the party's newly founded "Korean Peninsula Taskforce" as its founding member. This taskforce consisted of senior assembly member with expertise in foreign and inter-Korean relations, including later Party Leader Song Young Gil, will seek out to support ongoing momentum in Korean peninsula towards peace irrespective of leadership changes in Japan and United States.

She also actively promoted the establishment of Gadeokdo New International Airport and the related laws. Afterwards, Choi was appointed as the chairperson of the special committee for the Busan Gadeok New Airport Promotion of the Democratic Party.

In the 2021 by-election, she was widely considered as the Democratic Party's candidate for Busan Metropolitan City mayor. It is known that she has been asked to run for mayor election several times from the Busan Democratic Party, and in various opinion polls, she ranked second in the suitability of the Democratic Party candidate and firmly in second place among the Democratic Party supporters. However, she announced her intention not to run for the major election because the election was held for the reasons attributable to the Democratic Party. Later, she supported Kim Young-Chun, who later became Democratic Party's nominee for Pusan Major election. Although the Democratic Party lost heavily in the election, Kim Young-chun took first place in the Bukgangseo-eul (Kangseo District and Part of Buk District), where Choi directly led the election.

In 2021, Choi joined Lee Jae Myung's Presidential Campaign as a Policy Advisor and Spokeperson throughout the Democratic Primary. Choi had debated on the value and feasibilities of Universal Basic Income and other Lee's campaign pledges with Yoon Hee Suk before she resigned from the opposition party's candidate. She also co-led Lee's primary campaign team in Pusan, and contributed to his unexpected success in Pusan, which is the second largest city in Korea but politically conservative.

Political positions

She is a strong advocate of Gadeokdo New International Airport. Both Gimhae Airport and Gadeokdo New Airport are located in her constituency, Gangseo district of Busan. Choi Ji-eun actively pushed to establish the new Gadeok Airport and the law on the new Gadeok Airport, which passed early 2021. Afterwards, Choi was appointed as the chairperson of the special committee for the Busan Gadeok New Airport Promotion of the Democratic Party. She emphasizes the importance of the Gadeok New Airport for re-boosting and re-shaping Busan economy. She considers Singapore is a good benchmark for Pusan.

Choi has been contributing to shaping the Party's economic policy agenda and new legislations as a core member of the Party's strategic committees. She serves as the Vice-Chairman of the Policy Committee of the Democratic Party of Korea, a member of the National Economic Advisory Council, a member of the Innovation Committee, a member of Media Mediation Law Task Force, and a member of the Special Committee on Semiconductors.

She is a founding member of the 'Democracy 4.0 Researcher', a think tank led by pro-Moon (pro-Moon Jae-in) members of the Democratic Party.

Other information 

Choi works as an adjunct professor at the Graduate School of International Studies at Seoul National University and a member of the Presidential Policy Planning Committee, under the Moon Jae In administration, taking on major tasks in the field of economic policy including small business promotion policies, digital trade and big tech regulations.

Electoral history

References 

Sogang University alumni
Alumni of the University of Oxford
Minjoo Party of Korea politicians
21st-century South Korean women politicians
21st-century South Korean politicians
21st-century South Korean economists
World Bank people
People from Busan
1980 births
Living people
Harvard Kennedy School alumni